3rd Indian Cavalry Brigade may refer to

 3rd (Ambala) Cavalry Brigade of the British Indian Army in the First World War
 3rd (Meerut) Cavalry Brigade of the British Indian Army in the Second World War